Home Again is the sixth solo album by former Orange Juice singer Edwyn Collins, released 17 September 2007 on Heavenly Records.

The album was recorded at Collins' West Heath Studios in the winter of 2004 but was not completed until early 2007. In the interim, Collins' suffered two brain haemorrhages in February 2005 and was hospitalised for most of that year. After a long recovery process, he returned to his studio to mix the album in the winter of 2006 with the help of engineer Seb Lewsley.

Track listing

"One Is a Lonely Number" - 5:22
"Home Again" - 3:12
"You'll Never Know (My Love)" - 3:37
"7th Son" - 3:51
"Leviathan" - 4:29
"It's in Your Heart" - 2:48
"Superstar Talking Blues" - 2:57
"Liberteenage Rag" - 3:27
"A Heavy Sigh" - 5:27
"Written in Stone" - 4:05
"One Track Mind" - 3:38
"Then I Cried" - 3:18

The album was preceded by the single release of "You'll Never Know", on 10 September 2007.

Notes

Edwyn Collins albums
2007 albums
Heavenly Recordings albums
Albums produced by Edwyn Collins